Josip Vancaš (22 March 1859 – 15 December 1932) was an Austro-Hungarian and Yugoslav architect who spent most of his career in the Bosnian city of Sarajevo, where he designed over two hundred buildings. He also designed important buildings in present-day Croatia and Slovenia. He was also the first conductor of the Männergesangverein in Sarajevo, at its founding in 1887.

Life

Born into a Croat family in Sopron, Hungary, where his father worked as a postal clerk, Vancaš attended the High Technical School in Zagreb, where his father had been appointed postmaster. 
He then moved to Vienna to study architecture at the Technical University from 1876 to 1881.
For one year Vancaš worked in the atelier of Ferdinand Fellner and Hermann Helmer, then graduated in 1883 at the Art Academy in Vienna under the supervision of Friedrich von Schmidt, expert in medieval architecture, from whom he adopted the eclecticism-historical styles.

Schmidt recommended Vancaš to Benjamin Kállay to design the Sarajevo Cathedral, and Vancaš came to Sarajevo in 1884, working for the government until 1890 and then running his own studio till 1921. He would remain there for thirty-seven years, becoming a leading architectural authority, a member of the first Bosnian Parliament (1910), and the deputy mayor of Sarajevo.

During his long career Vancaš remained devote admirer of Viennese architectural trends and often included them in his Bosnia and Herzegovina projects. However he did not limit himself to merely imitating role-models and tried to adapt Viennese models to Bosnian conditions. Historicism and eclecticism dominate in his works but the elements of Vienna Secession occur later as well. In his projects he goes from pseudo-romantic to pseudo-oriental influences. He studied the Bosnian local architecture and attempted by applying its characteristic elements to create a truly Bosnian style.

Vancaš also recognised a Bosnian style which can be compared with Scandinavian National Romanticism. The Bosnian Style was championed by a younger generation of architects, like Czech architect Josip Pospošil, Slovene architect Rudolf Tönnies, and Austrian architect Ernst Lichtblau, who all studied at the Art Academy in Vienna with Karl von Hasenauer and Otto Wagner. The style was, however, named by Sarajevo’s senior architect, Josip Vancaš, for whom many of these younger architects worked.

During his long time in Bosnia (1883–1921) Vancaš constructed 102 houses, 70 churches, 12 schools, 10 palaces, 10 banks, 10 government municipal buildings, 6 hotels and taverns, and remodeled a series of buildings. Vancaš also produced drafts for church altars as well as drawings for the residential and ecclesiastical interiors. He exhibited his work at world exhibitions in Budapest (1896), Vienna (1898) and Paris (1900). In 1911, as a representative in Bosnia-Herzegovina Parliament, he submitted a resolution on the protection of cultural monuments in Bosnia & Herzegovina.

On 29 June 1914, Vancaš was one of the speakers addressing the crowd that later vandalized and looted Serb-owned property in Sarajevo during the unrest after Gavrilo Princip's assassination of Archduke Franz Ferdinand of Austria.

Vancaš also wrote several studies on Bosnian folk and urban architecture. From 1921 onwards he lived in Zagreb, where he died in Zagreb on 15 December 1932 at the age of 73.

Works 

His most significant works include:
 the neo-Gothic Sacred Heart Cathedral, Sarajevo  (1884–89)
 the neo-Renaissance palace of government, today the Presidency Building (1884-1886)
 the Parish Church of the Purified Heart of Mary in Bijeljina (1885)
 the Normann Palace in Osijek (1891-1894)
 the pseudo-folklore pavilion of Bosnia and Herzegovina during the Millennial Exhibition in Budapest (1896)
 the Seminary of St. Cyril and Methodius in Sarajevo (1892-1896)
 the First Croatian Savings Bank in Zagreb (1898–1900)
 the People's Loan Bank in Ljubljana (1900-1907)
 the Ješua D. Salom Mansion in Sarajevo (1901)
 the Mathilde Villa in Sarajevo (1902-1903), 
 the parish church of St. George in Desinic (1901-1902)
 the parish church of St. Nicholas in Krapina (1901-1903)
 St. Stanislaus Institute in Ljubljana (1901-1905)
 the Hotel Union in Ljubljana (1902-1903)
 the City Savings Bank in Ljubljana (1902-1903)
 the Church of St. Michael in Vareš (1905-1906) 
 the Central Post Office and Telegraph Palace in Sarajevo (1907-1913)
 St. Peter's Parish Church, Radeče (1911)
 the Queen of the Holy Rosary Church in Sarajevo
 the parish church of St.Michael (Sv.Mihovil) in Vareš
 the parish church of St. John the Baptist in Konjic (1894 - 1918)

Although he worked mostly in the territory of Bosnia and Herzegovina, as shown by the list of his works, he realized part of his work in Croatia. Working on various projects financed mostly by the Croatian Government, Vancaš became known alongside Herman Bollé as the most important designer of sacral structures in Croatia in the last decades of the 19th and early 20th centuries. He designed equally in the Neo-Gothic, Neo-Romanesque, Neo-Renaissance, rarely in the Neo-Byzantine and Neo-Baroque style, and since the end of the 19th century he turned to secession. 

He also achieved great work in the area of the then Carniola province (central part of present-day Slovenia), where he built churches in Bled, Prečna and Mirna Peča, and a number of buildings in Ljubljana.

Buildings

See also

 František Blažek
 Karel Pařík
 Alexander Wittek
 Juraj Neidhardt
 Architecture of Mostar
 Bosnian style in architecture

References

External links 
 Josip Vancas at Sarajevo Travel

 01
Art Nouveau architects
Vienna Secession architects
19th-century Croatian architects
20th-century Croatian architects
Hungarian architects
1859 births
1932 deaths
Architects from Zagreb
Architects from Sarajevo
TU Wien alumni